Sonam Topgyal (1940 – 30 December 2012) was Prime Minister (officially Kalön Tripa) of the Central Tibetan Administration (Tibetan government-in-exile). He held the position from 1996 to 2001.

References 

1940 births
2012 deaths
Prime Ministers of Tibet
Central Tibetan Administration
Tibetan politicians
Banaras Hindu University alumni
People from Dharamshala
Chinese expatriates in India
Tibetan emigrants to India
Tibetan refugees